Sujit Bose is an Indian politician who is serving as Minister in the Government of West Bengal and also as a Member of the Legislative Assembly from Bidhannagar. He belongs to All India Trinamool Congress.

References 

West Bengal politicians
21st-century Indian politicians
West Bengal MLAs 2011–2016
West Bengal MLAs 2016–2021
West Bengal MLAs 2021–2026
1962 births
Living people